Hiroyuki Yamamoto (born April 30, 1986) is a Japanese professional long-distance runner.

Yamamoto has competed at several major marathons throughout his professional career. His 4th-place finish at the 2016 TCS New York City Marathon earned him $25,000 dollars in prize money. As of January, 2021, his 10th-place finish at the 2017 Tokyo Marathon makes him the 82nd fastest marathoner in Japanese history and the 792 fastest marathoner in world history in a time of 2:09:12.

References

External links

1986 births
Living people
Japanese male long-distance runners
Japanese male marathon runners